The NGC 2841 group is a group of galaxies about 19.6 million light-years away from Earth. It includes the loose triplet NGC 2541, NGC 2500, and NGC 2552. NGC 2841 is the fourth-brightest galaxy in Ursa Major with an apparent magnitude of 9.2. It is 20' southeast of 3 Lyncis and just below the halfway point of an imaginary line between Theta and 15 Ursae Majoris.

References 

 G. De Vaucouleurs, 1975. Nearby Groups of Galaxies, ch. 5. the nearer groups within 10 megaparsecs. Published in "Galaxies and the Universe," ed. by A. Sandage, M. Sandage and J. Kristian.

 
Lynx (constellation)
Ursa Major (constellation)